Ausee is a lake of Upper Austria. It spans 23 acres and is up to 10 m deep.

Lakes of Upper Austria